Bleddyn ap Cynfyn ( AD 1075), sometimes spelled Blethyn, was an 11th-century Welsh king. Harold Godwinson and Tostig Godwinson installed him and his brother, Rhiwallon, as the co-rulers of Gwynedd on his father's death in 1063, during their destruction of the kingdom of their half-brother, Gruffydd ap Llywelyn. Bleddyn became king of Powys and co-ruler of the Kingdom of Gwynedd with his brother Rhiwallon from 1063 to 1075. His descendants continued to rule Powys as the House of Mathrafal.

Background
Bleddyn was born to a poorly documented Powys nobleman named Cynfyn ap Gwerystan, known only from the late traditional pedigrees reporting Bleddyn's parentage. Cynfyn's claimed father, Gwerstan or Gwerystan, is given contradictory Welsh pedigrees consisting mostly of otherwise unknown names, a possibly spurious derivation since his name perhaps actually represents a rendering of the Anglo-Saxon name Werestan.  Cynfyn, likely a supporter of king Llywelyn ap Seisyll, would after the latter's 1023 death marry the widowed queen, Angharad, daughter of King Maredudd of Dyfed, whose realm had been lost to the Irish pretender Rhain before its conquest by Llywelyn. Angharad and Cynfyn had at least two sons, Bleddyn and Rhiwallon, probably born in the late 1020s, who were thus maternal half-brothers of Gruffydd ap Llywelyn, Angharad's son by her first husband. Gruffydd, aged about ten and passed over for succession at the time of his father's death, slowly rebuilt his father's realm, annexing its successor states. Cynfyn and Rhiwallon first appear in the documentary record in 1063. Bleddyn may have been residing in Powys, where he married Haer ferch Cillyn, daughter of the Lord of Gest Cillyn y Blaidd Rudd ("Cillyn the Red Wolf").

Reign
Gruffydd's consolidation of power and alliance with Ælfgar of Mercia made him a threat to Harold Godwinson, earl of Hereford. Upon Ælfgar's death in 1060, Harold and his brother Tostig quickly invaded; the following year, they invaded again and were left in mastery of Wales after traitors among his men killed Gruffydd during a retreat. The south was restored to the Houses of Dinefwr and Morgan, but Powys and Gwynedd were given to Gruffydd's half-brothers Bleddyn and Rhiwallon. These two submitted to Harold and swore themselves vassals and allies of Edward the Confessor.

Closely allied with Harold, the brothers joined the Saxon resistance to William the Conqueror following his conquest of England. In 1067, they joined the Mercian Eadric the Wild in his attack on Norman Hereford, ravaging the lands as far as the River Lugg. In 1068, they joined Earls Edwin of Mercia and Morcar of Northumbria in their attacks as well.

In 1070, Gruffydd's sons, Idwal ap Gruffydd and Maredudd ap Gruffydd, challenged Bleddyn. Rhiwallon, Idwal and Maredudd all died in the Battle of Mechain. Bleddyn was the king of both Gwynedd and Powys.

In 1073, Robert of Rhuddlan stealthily established his forces on the banks of the River Clwyd and attempted to ambush and capture Bleddyn. He narrowly failed, but seized valuable booty in raids further south. Bleddyn was killed in 1075 by King Rhys ab Owain of Deheubarth, having been betrayed by the lords of Ystrad Tywi. When Rhys was later defeated at the 1078 Battle of Goodwick (or Pwllgwdig) by Bleddyn's successor, Trahaearn ap Caradog, and killed by Caradog ap Gruffydd of Gwent shortly afterwards, this was hailed as vengeance "for the blood of Bleddyn ap Cynfyn, his first cousin." After his death, Gwynedd was seized by Trahaearn and later recovered for the House of Aberffraw by Gruffudd ap Cynan; but in Powys, Bleddyn was the founder of a dynasty which lasted until the end of the 13th century.

Legacy 
Bleddyn's legacy in the Chronicle of the Princes was that of a benevolent ruler: 

Bleddyn was also responsible for a revision of the Welsh law which continued in force in his dynasty's domain of Powys. Gwynedd's Venedotian Code noted that he changed the legal composition of the homestead for purposes of inheritance etc., varying its size depending on the social status of the owner. The homestead of a nobleman was 12 Welsh acres, that of a serf ( ,  ) had 8, and that of a bondsman or slave (Med. ) had 4. (The text, however, notes the uncommonness of this division and says it was generally understood as 4 acres regardless of status.)

Children
Bleddyn had at least five children: 
 Maredudd (d. 1132)
 Cadwgan (d. 1111)
 Madog
 Rhirid (1049–1088)
 Iorwerth (d. 1111)

Notes

References

Citations

Bibliography

.
.
.
 .  &

Further reading

1075 deaths
Monarchs of Gwynedd
Monarchs of Powys
House of Mathrafal
11th-century Welsh monarchs
Year of birth unknown